The Gulick-Rowell House, on Missionary Row in Waimea, on Kauai, in Hawaii, is a historic house that is listed on the U.S. National Register of Historic Places.  It is located across from Waimea Canyon Middle School, on way to Kauai Veterans Memorial Hospital, first built 1829 by Rev. Peter Johnson Gulick, completed by Rev. George Rowell in 1846.

It was built of coral limestone cut from reefs offshore and floated in.

It was listed on the Hawaiʻi Register of Historic Places in 1977 and on the National Register of Historic Places in 1978.

References

External links 
 Historic Hawai'i
 Kauai.com

Houses on the National Register of Historic Places in Hawaii
Houses completed in 1846
Houses in Kauai County, Hawaii
National Register of Historic Places in Kauai County, Hawaii
Hawaii Register of Historic Places